Karl Lind (19 September 1880 – 16 February 1957) was a Finnish wrestler. He competed in the light heavyweight event at the 1912 Summer Olympics.

References

External links
 

1880 births
1957 deaths
Olympic wrestlers of Finland
Wrestlers at the 1912 Summer Olympics
Finnish male sport wrestlers
People from Porvoo
Sportspeople from Uusimaa